A flyer (or flier) is a form of paper advertisement intended for wide distribution and typically posted or distributed in a public place, handed out to individuals or sent through the mail. In the 2010s, flyers range from inexpensively photocopied leaflets to expensive, glossy, full-color circulars. There are also digital flyers, similar to the printed ones, but can be shared on the internet.

Terminology
A flyer is also called a "circular", "handbill", "pamphlet", "poster", "lit'" (literature), "weekly ad", "catalogue" or "leaflet".

Usage

Flyers may be used by individuals, businesses, not-for-profit organizations or governments to:
 Advertise an event such as a music concert, nightclub appearance, festival, or political rally
 Promote a goods-selling businesses such as a used car lot discount store or a service business such as a restaurant or massage parlour.
 Persuade people about a social, religious, or political message, as in evangelism or political campaign activities on behalf of a political party or candidate during an election. Flyers have been used in armed conflict: for example, airborne leaflet propaganda has been a tactic of psychological warfare.
 Recruit members for organizations or companies.

Like postcards, pamphlets and small posters, flyers are a low-cost form of mass marketing or communication. There are many different flyer formats. Some examples include:
 A4 (roughly letterhead size)
 A5 (roughly half letterhead size)
 DL (compliments slip size)
 A6 (postcard size)

Flyers are inexpensive to produce and they required only a basic printing press from the 18th century to the 20th century. Their widespread use intensified in the 1990s with the spread of less expensive desktop publishing systems. In the 2010s, inexpensive black and white flyers can be produced with just a personal computer and a computer printer. In the 2010s, the ordering of flyers through traditional printing services has been supplanted by Internet services. Customers send designs, review proofs online or via e-mail and receive the final products by mail.

Flyers are not a new medium: prior to the War of American Independence some colonists were outraged with the Stamp Act (1765) and gathered together in anti-stamp act congresses and meetings. In these congresses they had to win support, and issued handbills and leaflets, pamphlets, along with other written paraphernalia, to do so.

In the 2000s, some jurisdictions have laws or ordinances banning or restricting leafleting or flyering in certain locations. Owners of private property may put up signs saying "Post No Bills"; this occurs particularly on wooden fences surrounding building sites or vacant lots.

Distribution and use
Flyers are handed out on the street (a practice known as "flyering" or "leafleting"), distributed door-to-door through the mail, posted on bulletin boards, put under windshield wipers of cars, given away at events or on the street, or affixed to telephone poles, walls, or other surfaces. Bulletin boards are found on college campuses, in cafés, community meeting houses, laundromats and small markets. Cheap to produce, contemporary flyers are frequently produced in 300 g/m2 glossy card, whereas a leaflet might be produced on a 130 g/m2–170 g/m2 weight paper and can be a very effective form of direct marketing.

In the 2010s, some individuals and organizations send flyers through e-mail, a tactic that avoids spending money on paper, printing and mailing or hiring people to post the flyers on telephone poles or hand them out. The digital flyer may be embedded into the body of the e-mail or added as an attachment to be opened.

See also
 Canvassing
 Folded leaflet
 Street marketing

References

 Ackland-Snow, Nicola & Brett, Nathan & Williams, Steven. Fly: The Art of the Club Flyer. Watson-Guptill Publications, 1997. 
 Searching for the Perfect Beat: Flyer Designs of the American Rave Scene. Watson-Guptill, 2000. by The Earth Program (Author), Neil Strauss (Introduction). 
 Barcelona Club Flyers (Actar Publishing, 1999), by Tite Barbuzza (Contributor), Joan Manel Jubany (Contributor), Albert Masferrer (Contributor), Yolanda Muelas (Contributor), 
 Büru Destruct (Consortium Book Sales & Dist, 1999), By Büru Destruct, 
 Clubspotting (Happy Books, 2000), by Paolo Davoli & Gabriele Fantuzzi, 
 Design After Dark: The Story of Dancefloor Style (Thames and Hudson, London, 1991), by Cynthia Rose, 
 Design Agent 007: License to Design DGV. Die gestaften Verlag, Berlin 2002. 
 Event Flyer Graphics. Nippan/Biblios, 2001. 
 Flyer Soziotope: Topography of a Media Phenomenon. (Archiv der Jugendkulturen (G)/Actar (ES), 2005), German-English and English-German. , 
 Klanten, Robert & Peyerl, Andreas & Hollmann-Loges, Markus: Flyermania: European Flyers. Art Books Intl Ltd, 1998. 
 Highflyers: Clubravepartyart. By 3 Beat Music. Booth Clibborn Editions, London, UK, 1995. 
 Beddard, Phil: Nocturnal: Global Highflyers. Booth-Clibborn, 2000. 
 Jordan, Joel T. et alii: Searching for the Perfect Beat: Flyer Designs of the American Rave Scene. Watson-Guptill Pubns, US, 2000.

External links
 

Advertising publications by format
Direct marketing
Political communication
Propaganda
Pamphlets